Michael Brüning (born November 11, 1969) is a male beach volleyball player from the United States who won the gold medal at the NORCECA Circuit 2009 at Cayman Islands playing with Jason Wight.

Michael was born in Tucson, Arizona. He is legally deaf, and he had participated in four Deaflympics Games. In the 1993 edition, his team won the silver medal indoors and in 2005, he won the silver medal in beach volleyball, playing with Scott Majorino.

Awards

National Team
 NORCECA Beach Volleyball Circuit Cayman Islands 2009  Gold Medal
 NORCECA Beach Volleyball Circuit Boca Chica 2009  Silver Medal

Deaflympics Games
 XVII Edition at Sofia, Bulgaria (1993) – Indoor Volleyball  – Silver Medal
 XX Edition at Melbourne, Australia (2005) – Beach Volleyball  – Silver Medal
 XXI Edition at Taipei, Taiwan (2009) – Beach Volleyball  – Silver Medal

References

External links
 
 Mike Brüning at AVP 

1969 births
Living people
American men's beach volleyball players